Saanijärvi is a  medium-sized lake of Finland. It is situated in Pihtipudas in Central Finland and it belongs to the Kymijoki main catchment area.

See also
List of lakes in Finland

References

Lakes of Pihtipudas